Hexafluoroisopropanol, commonly abbreviated HFIP, is the organic compound with the formula (CF3)2CHOH.  This fluoroalcohol finds use as solvent and synthetic intermediate. It appears as a colorless, volatile liquid that is characterized by a strong, pungent odor. As a solvent hexafluoro-2-propanol is polar and exhibits strong hydrogen bonding properties enabling it to dissolve substances that serve as hydrogen-bond acceptors, such as amides and ethers. (CF3)2CHOH is classified as a hard Lewis acid and its acceptor properties are discussed in the ECW model. Its relative acceptor strength toward a series of bases, versus other Lewis acids, can be illustrated by C-B plots. Dual XH–π interaction of HFIP with arenes has been found (benzene/HFIP, 7.22 kcal/mol) even stronger than the hydrogen bond in a water dimer (5-6 kcal/mol).  Hexafluoro-2-propanol is transparent to UV light with high density, low viscosity and low refractive index.

Production and uses
Hexafluoro-propan-2-ol is prepared from hexafluoropropylene through hexafluoroacetone, which is then hydrogenated.
(CF3)2CO + H2 → (CF3)2CHOH

Hexafluoro-propan-2-ol is a speciality solvent for some polar polymers and organic synthesis. It is especially effective for solubilizing a wide range of polymers, including those that are not soluble in the most common organic solvents, such as: polyamides, polyacrylonitriles, polyacetals, polyesters (e.g. polyglycolide), and polyketones. It has also found use in biochemistry to solubilize peptides and to monomerize β-sheet protein aggregates. Because of its acidity (pKa = 9.3), it can be used as acid in volatile buffers for ion pair HPLC - mass spectrometry of nucleic acids. Recent studies showed an ability of HFIP to activate allylic alcohols, stabilise an allylic cation, and further functionalize to allylic sulphides and sulfones.

Medicine
It is both the precursor and the chief metabolite of the inhalation anesthetic sevoflurane. Sevoflurane gets metabolized within the body into HFIP and formaldehyde. HFIP is inactive, non-genotoxic and once formed, is rapidly conjugated with glucuronic acid and eliminated as a urinary metabolite.

Safety
Hexafluoro-2-propanol is a volatile, corrosive liquid that can cause severe burns and respiratory problems. Animal experiments show possible adverse effects on fertility, placing HFIP as a reproductive toxicity category 2 material.

Environment
PMT/vPvM substances are very persistent in the environment and very mobile in the aquatic environment (vPvM); or, substances that are persistent in the environment, mobile in the aquatic environment and toxic (PMT).  According to REACH, HFIP meets the PMT/vPvM criteria, but as of May 2017 is considered exempt from the PMT/vPvM assessment as HFIP belongs to Category 4: Exempt PMT/vPvM substances. HFIP also belongs to per- and polyfluorinated alkyl substances (PFAS). There is no precisely clear definition of what constitutes a PFAS substance given the inclusion of partially fluorinated substances, polymers, and ill-defined reaction products on these various lists.

References

Sources

External links
Application note on quantification of HFIP in polymers

Trifluoromethyl compounds
Halogenated solvents
Secondary alcohols